Mangy may mean:

 afflicted with mange, a skin disease
 afflicted with one of several other skin diseased colloquially known as mange
 scruffy, shabby, squalid, or decrepit

See also 
 Mangy Hill, in Alaska
 
 Magny (disambiguation)
 Mangi (disambiguation)
 Mangui